Lovelorn is the debut studio album by the Norwegian/German symphonic metal band Leaves' Eyes, released in 2004. Almost all vocals on the album are by Liv Kristine, but there are also some death growls by Alexander Krull.

Track listing

Personnel

Band members
Liv Kristine Espenæs - lead vocals, keyboards
Alexander Krull - death grunts, programming, keyboards
Thorsten Bauer - guitars, keyboards
Mathias Röderer - guitars, keyboards
Christopher Lukhaup - bass, keyboards
Martin Schmidt - drums, percussion, programming, keyboards

Guest musicians
Carmen Elise Espenæs - backing vocals on track 9
Timon Birkhofer - piano and cello on tracks 5 and 7

Production
Alexander Krull - producer, engineer, mixing, mastering
Chris Lukhaup, Martin Schmidt, Mathias Röderer, Thorsten Bauer - assistant engineers

References

Leaves' Eyes; "Lovelorn" CD. 2004, Napalm Records.

2004 debut albums
Leaves' Eyes albums
Napalm Records albums
Albums produced by Alexander Krull